The Minamata Convention on Mercury is an international treaty designed to protect human health and the environment from anthropogenic emissions and releases of mercury and mercury compounds.  The convention was a result of three years of meeting and negotiating, after which the text of the convention was approved by delegates representing close to 140 countries on 19 January 2013 in Geneva and adopted and signed later that year on 10 October 2013 at a diplomatic conference held in Kumamoto, Japan.  The convention is named after the Japanese city Minamata.  This naming is of symbolic importance as the city went through a devastating incident of mercury poisoning.  It is expected that over the next few decades, this international agreement will enhance the reduction of mercury pollution from the targeted activities responsible for the major release of mercury to the immediate environment.

The objective of the Minamata Convention is to protect the human health and the environment from anthropogenic emissions and releases of mercury and mercury compounds.  It contains, in support of this objective, provisions that relate to the entire life cycle of mercury, including controls and reductions across a range of products, processes and industries where mercury is used, released or emitted.  The treaty also addresses the direct mining of mercury, its export and import, its safe storage and its disposal once as waste.  Pinpointing populations at risk, boosting medical care and better training of health-care professionals in identifying and treating mercury-related effects will also result from implementing the convention.

The Minamata Convention provides controls over a myriad of products containing mercury, the manufacture, import and export of which will be altogether prohibited by 2020, except where countries have requested an exemption for an initial 5-year period. These products include certain types of batteries, compact fluorescent lamps, relays, soaps and cosmetics, thermometers, and blood pressure devices.  Dental fillings which use mercury amalgam are also regulated under the convention, and their use must be phased down through a number of measures.

Background on mercury 
Mercury is a naturally occurring element.  It can be released to the environment from natural sources – such as weathering of mercury-containing rocks, forest fires, volcanic eruptions or geothermal activities – but also from human activities.  An estimated 5500-8900 tons of mercury is currently emitted and re-emitted each year to the atmosphere, with much of the re-emitted mercury considered to be related to human activity, as are the direct releases.

Due to its unique properties, mercury has been used in various products and processes for hundreds of years.  Currently, it is mostly utilised in industrial processes that produce chloride (PVC) production, and polyurethane elastomers.  It is extensively used to extract gold from ore in artisanal and small-scale gold mining.  It is contained in products such as some electrical switches (including thermostats), relays, measuring and control equipment, energy-efficient fluorescent light bulbs, some types of batteries and dental amalgam.  It is also used in laboratories, cosmetics, pharmaceuticals, including in vaccines as a preservative, paints, and jewelry.  Mercury is also released unintentionally from some industrial processes, such as coal-fired power and heat generation, cement production, mining and other metallurgic activities such as non-ferrous metals production, as well as from incineration of many types of waste.

The single largest source of human-made mercury emissions is the artisanal and small-scale gold mining sector, which is responsible for the release of as much as 1,000 tonnes of mercury to the atmosphere every year.

History of the negotiations
Mercury and mercury compounds have long been known to be toxic to human health and the environment. Large-scale public health crises due to mercury poisoning, such as Minamata disease and Niigata Minamata disease, drew attention to the issue.  In 1972, delegates to the Stockholm Conference on the Human Environment witnessed Japanese junior high school student Shinobu Sakamoto, disabled as the result of methylmercury poisoning in utero.  The United Nations Environment Programme (UN Environment, previously UNEP) was established shortly thereafter.  UN Environment has been actively engaged in bringing the science of mercury poisoning to policy implementation.  In 2001, the executive director of UN Environment was invited by its governing council to undertake a global assessment of mercury and its compounds, including the chemistry and health effects, sources, long-range transport, as well as prevention and control technologies relating to mercury.

In 2003, the governing council considered this assessment and found that there was sufficient evidence of significant global adverse impacts from mercury and its compounds to warrant further international action to reduce the risks to human health and the environment from their release to the environment.  Governments were urged to adopt goals for the reduction of mercury emissions and releases and UN Environment initiated technical assistance and capacity-building activities to meet these goals.

A mercury programme to address the concerns posed by mercury was established and further strengthened by governments in 2005 and 2007 with the UNEP Global Mercury Partnership.  In 2007, the governing council concluded that the options of enhanced voluntary measures and new or existing international legal instruments should be reviewed and assessed in order to make progress in addressing the mercury issue.  In February 2009, the governing council of UNEP decided to develop a global legally binding instrument on mercury.

An intergovernmental negotiating committee (INC) was promptly established, through which countries negotiated and developed the text of the convention.  Other stakeholders, including intergovernmental and non-governmental organizations also participated in the process and contributed through sharing of views, experience and technical expertise.  The Intergovernmental Negotiating Committee was chaired by Fernando Lugris of Uruguay and supported by the Chemicals and Health Branch of UN Environment's Economy Division.  The INC held five sessions to discuss and negotiate a global agreement on mercury:

 INC 1, 7 to 11 June 2010, in Stockholm, Sweden
 INC 2, 24 to 28 January 2011, in Chiba, Japan
 INC 3, 31 October to 4 November 2011, in Nairobi, Kenya
 INC 4, 27 June to 2 July 2012, in Punta del Este, Uruguay
 INC 5, 13 to 18 January 2013, in Geneva, Switzerland

On 19 January 2013, after negotiating late into the night, the negotiations concluded with close to 140 governments agreeing to the draft convention text.  The convention was adopted and opened for signature for one year on 10 October 2013, at a conference of plenipotentiaries (diplomatic conference) in Kumamoto, Japan, preceded by a preparatory meeting from 7–8 October 2013.  The European Union and 86 countries signed the convention on the first day it was opened for signature.  A further 5 countries signed the convention on the final day of the diplomatic conference, 11 October 2013.  In total, the convention has 128 signatories.

Fernando Lugris, the Uruguayan chair delegate, proclaimed, "Today in the early hours of 19 January 2013 we have closed a chapter on a journey that has taken four years of often intense but ultimately successful negotiations and opened a new chapter towards a sustainable future.  This has been done in the name of vulnerable populations everywhere and represents an opportunity for a healthier and more sustainable century for all peoples."

Further to the adoption of the convention, the intergovernmental negotiating committee was mandated to meet during the interim period preceding the opening of the first meeting of the Conference of the Parties to the convention to facilitate its rapid entry into force and effective implementation upon entry into force. Two sessions of the INC were held:
 INC 6, 3 to 7 November 2014, in Bangkok, Thailand
 INC 7, 10 to 15 March 2016, in Dead Sea, Jordan
Discussions covered a number of technical, financial as well as administrative and operational aspects.

The convention required to enter into force the deposit of fifty instruments of ratification, acceptance, approval or accession by states or regional economic integration organizations.  This fifty-ratification milestone was reached on 18 May 2017, hence the convention entered into force on 16 August 2017.

The first meeting of Conference of the Parties to the Minamata Convention on Mercury (COP1) took place from 24 to 29 September 2017 at the International Conference Center in Geneva.

The second meeting of the Conference of the Parties (COP2) took place from 19 to 23 November 2018 at the International Conference Center in Geneva, Switzerland.

The third meeting of the Conference of the Parties (COP3) took place from 25 to 29 November 2019 at the International Conference Center in Geneva, Switzerland. At its third meeting, the Conference of the Parties agreed on a number of action items to effectively implement the Minamata Convention.

After the convention entered into force, the Conference of the Parties took place yearly for the first three years.  From now onward, next Conference of the Parties (COPs) will be convened in every two years.

The fourth meeting of the Conference of the Parties (https://www.mercuryconvention.org/en/meetings/cop4) (COP4) will take place in Nusa Dua, Bali, Indonesia from 21 to 25 March 2022.

List of signatories and parties
As of December 2022, there are 128 signatories to the treaty and 139 parties.

Provisions
The convention has 35 articles, 5 annexes and a preamble.

The preamble of the convention states that the parties have recognized that mercury is, "a chemical of global concern owing to its long-range atmospheric transport, its persistence in the environment once anthropogenically introduced, its ability to bioaccumulate in ecosystems and its significant negative effects on human health and the environment."

Article 1 
States the objective of the convention, which is "to protect the human health and the environment from anthropogenic emissions and releases of mercury and mercury compounds".

Article 2 
 Sets out definitions used in more than one Article of the convention, including:
 "Artisanal and small-scale gold mining" which refers to gold mining conducted by individual miners or small enterprises with limited capital investment and production;
 "Best available techniques";
 "Best environmental practices" means using the most appropriate combination of environmental control measures and strategies;
 "Mercury" specifically refers to elemental mercury (Hg), CAS No. 7439-97-6;
 "Mercury compound";
 "Mercury-added product" refers to a product or product component that contains mercury or a mercury compound that was intentionally added;
 "Party" and "Parties present and voting";
 "Primary mercury mining";
 "Regional economic integration organization";
 "Use allowed".

Article 3
 Addresses the question of mercury supply sources and trade.
 The provisions of this Article do not apply to mercury compounds used for laboratory research, naturally occurring trace quantities of mercury or mercury compounds present, mercury-added products.
 It prohibits parties to allow mercury mining that was not being conducted prior to the date of entry into force of the convention for them, and it only allows mercury mining that was conducted at the date of entry into force for up to fifteen years after that date.
 It encourages countries to identify individual stocks of mercury or mercury compounds exceeding 50 metric tons as well as sources of mercury supply generating stocks exceeding 10 metric tons per year. If excess mercury from the decommissioning of chlor alkali facilities is available, such mercury is disposed of in accordance with the guidelines for environmentally sound management using operations that do not lead to recovery, recycling, reclamation, direct re-use or alternative uses.
 Parties are not allowed to export mercury without the written consent of the importing Party and only for either environmentally sound interim storage or a use allowed. These controls only apply to mercury, not to either mercury compounds or mercury-added products.

Article 4
Addresses the question of mercury-added products.
The Convention employs two approaches to controlling mercury in products, namely setting a phase-out date for some, and specifying measures to be taken in allowing continued use for others.

Article 5
 Deals with manufacturing processes in which mercury or mercury compounds are used.
 Sets out measures either to phase out or to restrict such existing processes.
 It also does not allow the development of new facilities that would use manufacturing processes listed in Annex B and discourages the development of new manufacturing processes in which mercury or mercury compounds are intentionally used.

Article 6
 Relates to exemptions available to a Party upon request.
 A State or regional economic integration organization can register for one or more exemptions from the phase out dates listed in Parts I of Annexes A and B.
 They do so on becoming a Party, or in the case of a product or process that is added by amendment to the list, no later than the date upon which that amendment enters into force for it.
 Exemptions can be registered for a listed category or an identified sub-category.
 The registration is made by notifying the Secretariat in writing, and must be accompanied by a statement explaining the Party's need for the exemption.

Article 7
 Deals with the question of artisanal and small-scale gold mining and processing in which mercury amalgamation is used to extract gold from ore.
 Each Party that has small-scale gold mining and processing within its territory has the general obligation to take steps to reduce the use of mercury and mercury compounds in such mining and processing needs to reduce, and where feasible eliminate, the use of mercury and mercury compounds in mining and processing, as well as the emissions and releases to the environment of mercury from such activities.
 Additional obligations, including the development and implementation of a national action plan, are laid out for a Party that determines that artisanal and small-scale gold mining and processing in its territory is more than insignificant.

Article 8
 Concerns emissions of mercury and mercury compounds.
 It aims at controlling and, where feasible, reducing emissions of mercury and mercury compounds to the atmosphere, through measures to control emissions from the point sources listed in Annex D.
 The Article differentiates between measures required for new sources and those required for existing sources. Releases to land and water are not addressed in Article 8 – they are addressed in Article 9 of the convention.

Article 9
 Addresses the releases of mercury and mercury compounds to land and water
 Aims at controlling and where feasible reducing releases of mercury and mercury compounds from significant anthropogenic point sources that are not addressed in other provisions of the convention.
 Each state should within three years after of date of entry into force of the Convention identify the relevant point source categories of releases of mercury into land and water.

Article 10
 Applies to the environmentally sound interim storage of mercury other than waste mercury.
 Parties are requested to take measures to ensure that mercury and mercury compounds that are intended for a use allowed under the convention are stored in an environmentally sound manner, taking into account any guidelines and in accordance with any requirements that the Conference of Parties adopts.

Article 11
 Deals with mercury wastes, including their definition, their management in an environmentally sound manner and transportation across international boundaries.

Article 12
 Deals with contaminated sites.
 Each state needs to endeavour to develop appropriate strategies for identifying and assessing sites contaminated by mercury or mercury compounds.
 When taking action to reduce the risks posed by sites contaminated by mercury or mercury compounds, each Party is required to ensure that actions are performed in an environmentally sound manner, and actions incorporate, where appropriate, an assessment of the risks to human health and the environment from mercury or mercury compounds contained in these sites.

Article 13
 Relates to the question of financial resources and mechanism.
 Establishes a mechanism for the provision of adequate, predictable and timely financial resources, comprising the Global Environment Facility Trust Fund and a specific international programme to support capacity building and technical assistance.

Article 14
 Addresses the issues of capacity-building, technical assistance and technology transfer.
 Calls for cooperation between Parties to provide timely and appropriate capacity-building and technical assistance to developing country Parties, including through regional, sub regional and national arrangements.

Article 15
 Establishes an Implementation and Compliance Committee to promote implementation of, and compliance with, all provisions of this convention.
 The Committee comprises 15 members nominated by Parties and elected by the Conference of the Parties.
 Issues can be taken up by the committee on self-referral by a Party, on the basis of information submitted under the reporting provisions, or upon request from the Conference of the Parties.

Article 16
 Relates to health aspects.
 It encourages Parties to promote the development and implementation of strategies and programmes to identify and protect populations at risk It encourages Parties to adopt and implement science based educational and preventive programmes on occupational exposure to mercury and mercury compounds.
 It encourages Parties to promote appropriate health-care services for prevention, treatment and care for populations affected by the exposure to mercury or mercury compounds.
 Finally it encourages Parties to establish and strengthen institutional and health professional capacities.

Article 17
 Deals with information exchange.
 Each party shall facilitate the exchange of information.

Article 18
Stresses the importance of public information, awareness and education.

Article 19
 Relates to research, development and monitoring.

Article 20 
 Deals with the possibility for parties to develop an implementation plan.

Article 21
 Parties shall report to the Conference of the Parties, through the secretariat on the measures taken to implement the provisions of the convention and the effectiveness of those measures as well as the possible challenges in meeting the objectives of the convention.
 Parties shall include in their reporting the information called for in the different articles of the convention.

Article 22
 Deals with effectiveness evaluation.
 The Conference of the Parties needs to evaluate the effectiveness of the Convention no later than six years after the date of entry into force and periodically thereafter.

Article 23
 Establishes the Conference of the Parties.

Article 24
 Establishes the Secretariat, which is to be provided by the United Nations Environment Programme.

Article 25
 Deals with the settlement of disputes between Parties.

Article 26
 Sets the rules for the amendments to the convention.
 Amendments to the Convention may be proposed by any Party, and they must be adopted at a meeting of the Conference of the Parties.
 Ratification (acceptance or approval) of an amendment shall be notified to the Depositary in writing.

Article 27
Sets the rules for adoption and amendment of annexes.

Article 28
 Establishes the rules for the right to vote: one party, one vote, except in the case of a regional economic integration organization, which, on matters within its competence, shall exercise its right to vote with a number of votes equal to the number of its members States that are Parties to the convention. Such an organization shall not exercise its right to vote if any of its member States exercises its right to vote and vice versa.

Article 29
 Relates to the signature of the convention, which was open for one year until 9 October 2014.

Article 30
 Deals with the ratification, acceptance, approval of the convention or accession thereto.

Article 31
 Deals with the convention's entry into the force, which will take place on the ninetieth day after the date of deposit of the fiftieth instrument of ratification, acceptance, approval or accession.

Article 32
States that no reservations may be made to the convention.

Article 33
 Gives the right to Parties to withdraw from the Convention at any time after three years from the date on which the convention has entered into force for them, through written notification to the Depositary.
 Any such withdrawal shall take effect one year after the receipt of the notification by the depositary or any later specified date.

Article 34
 Names The Secretary-General of the United Nations as the depositary of the convention.

Article 35
 States that the Arabic, Chinese, English, French, Russian and Spanish texts of the convention are equally authentic.

Minamata Convention on Mercury COPs 
 COP-1 (Geneva, Switzerland), 24 - 29 September 2017
 COP-2 (Geneva, Switzerland), 19 - 23 November 2018
 COP-3 (Geneva, Switzerland), 25 - 29 November 2019
 COP-4 (online; Bali, Indonesia), 01 - 05 November 2021 (first segment), 21 - 25 March 2022 (second segment)
 COP-5 (Geneva, Switzerland), 30 October - 03 November 2023

See also
 Environmental law
 Environmental protocol
 International law
 List of international environmental agreements
 Mercury cycle

External links
 Official website of the Minamata Convention on Mercury

References

Minamata disease
Environmental treaties
Mercury control
Treaties concluded in 2013
2013 in Switzerland
2013 in Japan
Treaties not entered into force
Health treaties
Treaties of Antigua and Barbuda
Treaties of Argentina
Treaties of Bolivia
Treaties of Botswana
Treaties of Chad
Treaties of the People's Republic of China
Treaties of Djibouti
Treaties of Ecuador
Treaties of Gabon
Treaties of Guinea
Treaties of Guinea-Bissau
Treaties of Guyana
Treaties of Japan
Treaties of Jordan
Treaties of Kuwait
Treaties of Madagascar
Treaties of Mali
Treaties of Mauritania
Treaties of Mexico
Treaties of Monaco
Treaties of Mongolia
Treaties of Panama
Treaties of Peru
Treaties of Samoa
Treaties of São Tomé and Príncipe
Treaties of Senegal
Treaties of Seychelles
Treaties of Sierra Leone
Treaties of Eswatini
Treaties of Switzerland
Treaties of Tonga
Treaties of Turkey
Treaties of the United Arab Emirates
Treaties of the United States
Treaties of Uruguay
Treaties of Vanuatu
Treaties of Venezuela
Treaties of Zambia
Treaties extended to Hong Kong
Treaties extended to Macau
Treaties of Portugal
Treaties of Chile